Ursula "Uschi" Profanter (born March 22, 1968) is an Austrian sprint canoer and marathon canoeist who competed from the early 1990s to the early 2000s (decade). She won two bronze medals at the 1997 ICF Canoe Sprint World Championships in Dartmouth, earning them in the K-1 500 m and K-1 1000 m events.

Profanter also competed in three Summer Olympics, earning her best finish of fifth in the K-1 500 m event at Barcelona in 1992.

References

Sports-reference.com profile

1968 births
Austrian female canoeists
Canoeists at the 1992 Summer Olympics
Canoeists at the 1996 Summer Olympics
Canoeists at the 2000 Summer Olympics
Living people
Olympic canoeists of Austria
ICF Canoe Sprint World Championships medalists in kayak
Sportspeople from Graz